Tanabe Chikuunsai IV (born 1973) is a Japanese bamboo artist. His sculptural works and functional objects are hand made from tiger bamboo (torachiku). He is a fourth generation bamboo master. His family name, Chikuunsai means "master of the bamboo clouds".

Work
Chikuunsai IV often works on large scale bamboo installations in twisting woven forms. The art critic Roberta Smith described his work as forms that “have an animated-cartoon energy and snap; they cavort almost wickedly.”

Exhibitions
Chikuunsai IV's work has been the subject of one-person shows at the Asian Art Museum, Tai Modern, Santa Fe, and other venues.

Collections
His work can be found in the collection of the Metropolitan Museum of Art, and the Museum of the Minneapolis Institute of Art, the Seattle Museum of Art, the Asian Art Museum of San Francisco, among others.

Personal life
Chikuunsai IV comes from a line of several generations of bamboo masters, starting with his great grandfather Chikuunsai (1877–1937). His grandfather was Chikuunsai II (1910–2000), and his father Chikuunsai III.

Gallery

References

External links
 Tanabe Chikuunsai exhibition catalog

1973 births
21st-century Japanese artists
Living people